Angul district; also known as Anugul, is one of the thirty districts of Odisha in eastern India. The city of Angul is the district headquarters of Angul district.

Geography 
It is bounded by Dhenkanal and Cuttack district in the east, Deogarh, Kendujhar and Sundargarh district in north, Sambalpur and Sonepur in west and Boudh and Nayagarh in the south side. The district is abundant with natural resources.

A study jointly conducted by Indian Institute of Technology, Delhi (IIT-D) and Central Pollution Control Board (CPCB) reveals that Angul district is among the top ten most polluted Indian cities where the pollution level reached a "very alarming" level.

Divisions 
The following is the list of blocks, tehsils and subdivisions in the district of Angul:

Subdivisions

 Angul
 Athmallik
 Talcher
 Pallahara

Blocks

 Angul Sadar
 Athmallik Sadar
 Chhendipada
 Talcher Sadar
 Pallahada Sadar
 Banarpal
 Kishorenagar
 Kaniha

Tehsils

 Angul
 Athmallik
 Talcher
 Pallahada
 Chendipada
 Banarpal
 Kishorenagar
 Kaniha

Demographics 

According to the 2011 census, Angul district has a population of 1,273,821, ranking of 380th in India (out of a total of 640). Its population growth rate over the decade 2001–2011 was 11.55%. Anugul has a sex ratio of 942 females for every 1000 males, and a literacy rate of 78.96%. Scheduled Castes and Scheduled Tribes make up 18.81% and 14.10% of the population respectively.

At the time of the 2011 Census of India, 95.50% of the population in the district spoke Odia, 1.41% Ho and 1.30% Hindi as their first language.

Politics

Legislative Assembly Constituencies 

The following are the five Vidhan Sabha constituencies of Angul district and the elected members of the Angul district:

Lok Sabha constituencies 

Since 2008, Angul district is represented in Dhenkanal (Lok Sabha constituency) and Sambalpur (Lok Sabha constituency).

Angul (Lok Sabha constituency) does not exist in 1952 general elections to 1st Lok Sabha. However it is created from 2nd till 5th Lok Sabha during 1957 till 1976. Badakumar Pratap Gangadeb got elected in 1957 and 1971 for 2nd and 5th Lok Sabha while Harekrushna Mahatab was elected in 1962 to 3rd and D. N. Deb was elected in 1967 to 4th Lok Sabha. Angul Seat ceased after the creation of Deogarh (Lok Sabha constituency) in 1977 from 6th Lok Sabha. Deogarh seat was also delimited in 2008.

Natural resources and coal mines 

Angul district has the Radhikapur West coal block which is known for its good quality coal. In December 2020, the coal mines were auctioned for supplying to an Aluminium Smelter plant in Jharsuguda.

References

External links 

 

 
Coal mining districts in India
1993 establishments in Orissa
Districts of Odisha